Dezsőné Józsa (in Hungarian: Józsa Dezsőné, birth name: Ilona Szikora; born 17 January 1918) was a Hungarian athlete. She competed in the women's discus throw at the 1952 Summer Olympics.

References

External links
  

1918 births
Possibly living people
Athletes (track and field) at the 1952 Summer Olympics
Hungarian female discus throwers
Olympic athletes of Hungary